Facial weakness is a medical sign associated with a variety of medical conditions.

Some specific conditions associated with facial weakness include:
 Stroke
 Neurofibromatosis
 Bell's palsy
 Ramsay Hunt syndrome
 Spontaneous cerebrospinal fluid leak
 Myasthenia gravis

See also
 Acute facial nerve paralysis
 Facioscapulohumeral muscular dystrophy

References

External links 

 Differential diagnosis
 Diagram of appearance in stroke

Symptoms and signs: Nervous system